As-Silaʿ is a city in the Western Region of the Emirate of Abu Dhabi, the United Arab Emirates.

Description 
The city has been undergoing construction over the past years. A new hospital, a school, a police station and shops have been built. The area of Sila stretches west to the border with Saudi Arabia and encompasses the border town of Ghuwaifat and measures .
The census of 2005 recorded a population of 7,900 in Sila.)

Archaeology 
There are archaeological remains over 7,000 years old at Sila.

References 

Archaeological sites in the United Arab Emirates
Populated places in the Emirate of Abu Dhabi
Western Region, Abu Dhabi